The Condor Cliff Dam, formerly known as Néstor Kirchner Dam, is a concrete-face rock-fill dam being built on the Santa Cruz River about  west of Puerto Santa Cruz in Santa Cruz Province, Argentina. It was renamed after the former president Néstor Kirchner, born in Santa Cruz. A consortium led by China's Gezhouba Group was awarded the contract to build the Néstor Kirchner Dam and Jorge Cepernic Dam downstream in August 2013. The consortium will also fund the construction. Both dams are expected to cost nearly US$4.8 billion. It will be built by the firm Electroingeniería, led by Osvaldo Acosta and Gerardo Ferreyra.

In July 2015 machines arrived in Santa Cruz for the construction of the dams.

References

External links

Condor Cliff Dam
Condor Cliff Dam
Condor Cliff Dam
Condor Cliff Dam
Condor Cliff Dam
Condor Cliff Dam